A collage is a work of visual arts, constituted of heterogeneous parts stuck together.

Collage or Kollage may also refer to:

Music

Performers
 Collage (American band)
 Collage (American duo)
 Kollage (band), an Indian band
 Collage (Italian band)
 Collage (Taiwanese duo)
 DJ Collage, reggae vocalist and electronic music producer

Albums
 Kollage (album), an album by Bahamadia
 Collage (EP), a 2016 EP by the Chainsmokers
 Collage (M'Boom album) (1970)
 Collage (Le Orme album) (1971)
 Collage (Karrin Allyson album) (1996)
 Collage (Ratt album) (1997)
 Collage (U-KISS album) (2013)
 Collage, an album by Paul Revere & The Raiders
 Collage, an EP (and title song) by Vital Sines

Other
 Collage (Horner), a 2015 French horn concerto by James Horner
 "Collage", a song by James Gang from Yer' Album

Other uses
 Collage (geology), a tectonic unit type in geology
 Collages (novel), a 1964 novel by Anaïs Nin

See also
 College (disambiguation)
 Montage (disambiguation)